The flag used by the Mengjiang United Autonomous Government consists of a horizontal colour pattern of yellow, blue, white, red, white, blue and again yellow.

The colors on the flag were used to represent major ethnic groups in Mengjiang: blue for the Mongols; red for the Japanese; yellow for the Han and white for the "Hui" (the name given to the Muslims at that time).

South Chahar, North Shanxi and the Mongol Military Government each had their respective flags before merged with the Mengjiang United Autonomous Government.

The colors on the flag of Mengjiang is similar to the Five Races Under One Union flag formerly used by the Republic of China.

See also

 List of Chinese flags
 Flag of the People's Republic of China
 Flag of the Republic of China
 Flags of the Republic of China-Nanjing
 Flag of Manchukuo

References

Mengjiang
Mengjiang
Mengjiang
Flags introduced in 1939